Bartoš (feminine Bartošová) is a Czech and Slovak surname. Notable people with the surname include: 

 Adam Bartoš, Czech volleyball player
 Adrián Bartoš, Slovak footballer
 Alena Bartošová, Czech cross-country skier
 Antonín Bartoš, Czech soldier
 Armand Phillip Bartos (1910–2005), American architect
 Břetislav Bartoš, Czech painter
 František Bartoš (folklorist), Czech folklorist
 František Bartoš (motorcycle racer), Czech motorcycle racer
 Ivan Bartoš, Czech politician
 Ivan Bartoš (footballer), Slovak footballer
 Iveta Bartošová, Czech singer
 Jan Zdeněk Bartoš, Czech composer
 Jindřich Bartoš, Czech fighter pilot
 Marek Bartoš, Slovak footballer
 Pavel Bartoš, Czech volleyball player
 Peter Bartoš, Slovak ice hockey player
 Richard Bartoš, Slovak footballer

Czech-language surnames
Slovak-language surnames